Fatfield Woods is a woodland in Tyne and Wear, England, near Washington. It is owned and managed by the Woodland Trust.

References

Forests and woodlands of Tyne and Wear